The twenty-foot equivalent unit (abbreviated TEU or teu) is an inexact unit of cargo capacity, often used for container ships and container ports. It is based on the volume of a  intermodal container, a standard-sized metal box which can be easily transferred between different modes of transportation, such as ships, trains, and trucks.

It is common to designate a  container as 2 TEU, rather than 2.25 TEU.

Forty-foot equivalent unit 

Additionally there is a standard container with the same width but a doubled length of forty feet called a 40-foot (12.2m) container, which equals one forty-foot equivalent unit (often FEU or feu) in cargo transportation (considered to be two TEU, see below).

The twistlocks on a ship are put at a distance so that two standard twenty-foot containers have a gap of three inches which allows a single forty-foot container to be put on top.

The forty-foot containers have found wider acceptance, as they can be pulled by semi-trailer truck. The length of such a combination is within the limits of national road regulations in many countries, requiring no special permission. As some road regulations allow longer trucks, there are also variations of the standard forty-foot container – in Europe and most other places a container of  may be pulled as a trailer. Although longer than 40 feet, these variants are put in the same class of forty-foot equivalent units.

Equivalence

The carrying capacity of a ship is usually measured by mass (the deadweight tonnage) or by volume (the net register tonnage). Deadweight tonnage is generally measured now in metric tons (tonnes).

As the TEU is an inexact unit, it cannot be converted precisely into other units. The related unit forty-foot equivalent unit, however, is defined as two TEU. However, both  High cube and  half height containers are also reckoned as 1 TEU.

While the TEU is not itself a measure of mass, some conclusions can be drawn about the maximum mass that a TEU can represent.

Twenty-foot, "heavy tested" containers are available for heavy goods such as heavy machinery.

See also

 Containerization
 List of unusual units of measurement
 Panama Canal toll system
 Shipping ton

Footnotes

Citations

Bibliography

External links
 

Imperial units
Nautical terminology
Intermodal containers
Port infrastructure
Ship measurements
Equivalent units